Abu Jandal al-Masri is an Egyptian who served as a senior official in Daesh.  It was reported on January 23, 2017, that he was appointed to replace Abu Ahmed al-Souri as the group's Chief of Information.

According to the American Enterprise Institute he was a competent military commander, prior to serving as Chief of Information.

The Middle East Forum described him as a leader in the capture of the Mannagh Airbase.  They quoted a speech he gave, where he allegedly swore that Mujahideen fighters would "not leave a single Alawite alive in Syria."

References

Islamic State of Iraq and the Levant members from Egypt
Living people
Year of birth missing (living people)
Egyptian Islamists
Anti-Shi'ism